The Southern Jaguars basketball team is the basketball team that represents Southern University in Baton Rouge, Louisiana, United States. The school's team currently competes in the Southwestern Athletic Conference.

Postseason results

NAIA results
The Jaguars have appeared in the National Association of Intercollegiate Athletics (NAIA) Basketball Tournament one time. Their record is 2–1.

NCAA Division I Tournament results
The Jaguars have appeared in the NCAA tournament nine times, the second most appearances of any SWAC school. Their combined record is 1–9. They were the second (after Alcorn State in 1980) and, as of 2022, the most recent SWAC team to advance to the regional quarterfinals, or Round of 32. Their #13 seed in the 1993 tournament is the highest seed given to a SWAC team since the tournament expanded to 64 teams in 1985.

NIT results
The Jaguars have appeared in the National Invitation Tournament (NIT) one time. Their record is 0–1.

Retired numbers
The Jaguars have retired three numbers.

See also
List of NCAA Division I men's basketball programs

References

External links